Kirk Stewart Pierce is a lieutenant general in the United States Air Force. He is the current commander of the First Air Force.

Air Force career
Raised in Victor, New York, Pierce was commissioned in 1988 after he graduated from the University of Notre Dame with a degree in aerospace engineering. He attended pilot training at Williams AFB, and initially flew as a first assignment instructor pilot for the T-38 Talon. He transitioned to flying the F-16 Fighting Falcon in 1995. He was assigned to 79th Fighter Squadron at Shaw AFB and the 80th Fighter Squadron at Kunsan AB. In 2001, he transitioned to the United States Air National Guard, and was assigned to the 138th Fighter Squadron at Hancock Field Air National Guard Base. He commanded the 121st Fighter Squadron and the 113th Operations Group at Andrews AFB, and the 173rd Fighter Wing at Kingsley Field. In July 2020, he assumed command of the First Air Force at Tyndall AFB.

Awards and decorations

Effective dates of promotions

References

Year of birth missing (living people)
Living people
People from Victor, New York
University of Notre Dame alumni
National War College alumni
Recipients of the Defense Superior Service Medal
Recipients of the Legion of Merit
United States Air Force generals
United States Air Force personnel of the Iraq War